Black Fantasy is the fifth feature-length film produced and directed by American independent filmmaker Lionel Rogosin. It starred Jim Collier, who is credited also with "dialogue improvised by." Collier and Rogosin had previously worked together in Black Roots, produced two years earlier.

Largely improvised, it is Lionel Rogosin's most formally experimental film.

See also
 List of American films of 1972

External links
 

1972 films
Films directed by Lionel Rogosin
American independent films
1970s English-language films
1970s American films